This is a list of members of the Victorian Legislative Assembly, from the elections of 20 April 1892 to the elections of 20 September 1894. From 1889 there were 95 seats in the Assembly.

Victoria was a British self-governing colony in Australia at the time.

Note the "Term in Office" refers to that member's term(s) in the Assembly, not necessarily for that electorate.

Thomas Bent was Speaker, Francis Mason was Chairman of Committees.

 Bowman died 1 December 1893; replaced by Carty Salmon, sworn-in May 1894.
 Burrowes died 16 September 1893; replaced by Daniel Barnet Lazarus, sworn-in October 1893.
 Butterley died 29 December 1893; replaced by William Anderson, sworn-in May 1894.
 Campbell died 16 September 1893; replaced by John Templeton, sworn-in October 1893.
 Dow left Parliament in March 1893; replaced by Andrew Anderson, sworn-in June 1893.
 Highett resigned in June 1893; replaced by Richard O'Neill, sworn-in July 1893.
 Samuel died 27 July 1892; replaced by John Thomson, sworn-in August 1892
 Wyllie died 10 May 1893; replaced by Sylvanus Reynolds, sworn-in June 1893.

References

Members of the Parliament of Victoria by term
19th-century Australian politicians